Stefan Olsson (born 24 April 1987) is a Swedish wheelchair tennis player. Olsson is the former world number two singles player. He has won two Grand Slam titles in doubles, the 2009 US Open and the 2010 Wimbledon titles, and two in singles, at Wimbledon in 2017 and 2018. Olsson has won both the singles and doubles events at the year end Masters and is a Paralympic champion in men's doubles. He started playing tennis at the age of seven.

He competed in wheelchair tennis at the 2020 Summer Paralympics.

References

External links
 
 

1987 births
Living people
Swedish male tennis players
Swedish wheelchair tennis players
Paralympic wheelchair tennis players of Sweden
Paralympic gold medalists for Sweden
Paralympic silver medalists for Sweden
Paralympic medalists in wheelchair tennis
Wheelchair tennis players at the 2008 Summer Paralympics
Wheelchair tennis players at the 2012 Summer Paralympics
Wheelchair tennis players at the 2020 Summer Paralympics
Wheelchair tennis players at the 2016 Summer Paralympics
Medalists at the 2008 Summer Paralympics
Medalists at the 2012 Summer Paralympics
People from Falun
Sportspeople from Dalarna County
21st-century Swedish people